Min was a dynastic state of China and one of the Ten Kingdoms in existence between the years of 909 and 945. It existed in a mountainous region of modern-day Fujian province of China and had a history of quasi-independent rule. Its capital was Fuzhou. It was founded by Wang Shenzhi (Emperor Taizu).

Rulers of Min

Rulers family tree of Min

References

Citations

Sources 

 
Five Dynasties and Ten Kingdoms
Former countries in Chinese history
900s establishments
10th-century establishments in China
940s disestablishments
10th-century disestablishments in China
909 establishments
States and territories disestablished in the 940s